The Öland goose is a breed of domestic geese originating in Öland island in Sweden.

Origin
Öland goose is a landrace which was kept in Öland and Götaland. It was standardised in the 1920s. The breed was nearly extinct at the 1970s. Today there are 111 registered animals in Sweden.

Description
The plumage is pied white and brown-grey. Öland goose is generally weighing between 4.5 and 5.5 kg. (male) and 4-5 kg. (female). The Öland goose looks very similar to the Skåne goose, although the Öland goose is slightly greyer. The Öland goose is so territorial it is sometimes used as a watchdog.

References

See also
 List of goose breeds

Goose breeds originating in Sweden
Goose breeds